Ricardo Poma (born 1946) is the chief executive officer of the family-owned conglomerate Grupo Poma, based in San Salvador, El Salvador. 	

Poma obtained an industrial engineering degree from Princeton University in 1967 and an MBA from Harvard Business School in 1970. When he returned to El Salvador, Ricardo joined the family business; he took the reins of the conglomerate from his father Luis Poma in the 1980s. 

His family is one of the most affluent and influential in El Salvador.  

Ricardo Poma dedicates a significant amount of his time to social projects and institutions, such as the Salvadoran Foundation for Health and Human Development (FUSAL), the Advanced School of Business and Economics (ESEN) and Fundacion Poma, focusing on culture, education and health programs in El Salvador and Central America. He is also a member of the President's Leadership Council of the Inter-American Dialogue.

Poma was an early investor in Bain Capital.

Notes

1947 births
Living people
Princeton University alumni
Harvard Business School alumni
Salvadoran businesspeople
Bain Capital
Salvadoran chief executives
Salvadoran people of Spanish descent
Members of the Inter-American Dialogue